Malonomonas is a Gram-negative, non-spore-forming, chemoorganotrophic, anaerobic and motile genus of bacteria with single polar flagellum from the family of Pelobacteraceae  with one known species (Malonomonas rubra).
Strains of Malonomonas have been isolated from anoxic sediments. the bacteria Malonomonas rubra bacteria metabolizes malonate.

References

Further reading 
 

 

Desulfuromonadales
Monotypic bacteria genera
Bacteria genera